Fort of Greta may refer to:

 Fort of Greta (Horta)
 Fort of Greta (Angra do Heroísmo)